"Rocket science" in finance is a metaphor for activity carried out by specialised quantitative staff to provide detailed output from mathematical modeling and computational simulations to support investment decisions. Their work depends on use of complex mathematical models implemented in sophisticated IT environments.

For instance, a firm that invests its money in funds of investment is thought to have a result that depends on a mix of scientific questions and hazards. Different decisions in how to divide the financial resources into the funds lead to different sets of probabilities of return. Advising the investor about the consequences of each possible decision in the risk-return context is one of the typical roles of a rocket scientist.

Core activities 
Although the financial rocket science is found mostly in banks and financial enterprises, this area is emerging in firms with other kinds of core activities. The reasons why firms may have to hire these professionals vary and may be related to the core itself, or to auxiliary areas. An example of the first case is the one of an insurance firm that needs to calculate sets of probabilities of expenses, from probabilities of accident of its customers. The other one is advising about what the need every organization, or even every individual, has for properly deciding what to do with the money.

Goals  
The goal of a financial rocket scientist is to survey the high administration of a firm with the most precise scenario possible of the result probabilities in choosing decisions like investing, trading and borrowing. It means that not only how to invest money is a problem to rocket scientists, but also matters like pricing assets, creating new products or managing debts.

Skills 
The skills required of a financial rocket scientist are broadly based. These include knowledge of microeconomics, macroeconomics, pure mathematics, statistics, information technologies and financial market practice.

The microeconomics knowledge is necessary because the firm itself is an entity subject to microeconomics laws. Macroeconomics are needed to evaluate the response of groups of entities to a wide range of external factors and influences. Pure mathematics and statistics are required to solve the problems arising from questions submitted to the tech workers. Finally, financial market practice is needed to determine the possible decisions built into the financial models. Also, skill with Information Technology is required to prepare effective data-entry into complex computer systems.

Some concepts and tools found in this area are the Pareto optimum, the Value at Risk, and the Monte Carlo simulation.

It's not rocket science 
Although this phrase, very often found in sources of every kind, seems to deny the ontological existence of the theme here in approach, it actually means context-dependently that some matter is not difficult to understand in certain level of depth. The term Rocket Science  was originally derived from WWII rocket developments by Warner Von Braun and later by the NASA aerospace engineering program in the 1960s with the objective of reaching the moon.  It was later coined in 1995 by the child of comedian Davis Mathews

Similar activities 
Some professions or activities are similar but not identified with rocket science, and they are lied by common issues and relations mean-goal, these areas are basically the financial engineering and risk analysis, according to some sources. Nonetheless, a second and smaller set of sources found in this research identifies them as a unique matter.

See also 
 Computational finance
 Mathematical finance
 Financial modeling
 Securities
 Trading
 Derivatives
 Investment management

References 

Mathematical finance
Business intelligence terms